The Florida Gulf and Atlantic Railroad  is a Class III railroad owned and operated by RailUSA in the Florida Panhandle. The line consists of 373 miles (600 km) of track running from Baldwin, Florida (just west of Jacksonville) west through Tallahassee to Pensacola. The line also has a short branch from Tallahassee north to Attapulgus, Georgia. The line connects to CSX lines in Baldwin, Pensacola, and Attapulgus.

The FG&A began operation on June 1, 2019, after RailUSA acquired the line from CSX Transportation.

The Jacksonville-Pensacola line was the route of the Gulf Wind streamliner from 1949 to 1971. After two decades of freight-only service, passenger service resumed in 1993 when the route of Amtrak's Sunset Limited was extended beyond New Orleans to Orlando. Amtrak service was suspended in 2005 due to damage to track and trestles by Hurricane Katrina, and has never resumed east of New Orleans.

Lines and history

The 373 miles of the Florida Gulf & Atlantic Railroad comprise the main line between Baldwin and Pensacola. The main line is known as the Tallahassee Subdivision east of the Chattahoochee River and the P&A Subdivision west of the river. 
The Florida Gulf & Atlantic Railroad's Bainbridge Subdivision runs as a branch line between Tallahassee north to Attapulgus, Georgia. The system connects with CSX Transportation at each end of the line in Baldwin, Pensacola, and Attapulgus. CSX has trackage rights on the line but plans to use the line only if their lines to the north are impassable.

Tallahassee Subdivision

The Tallahassee Subdivision of the main line dates back to the mid-1800s. It was first built as the Florida, Atlantic and Gulf Central Railroad from Lake City to Jacksonville in 1857. The Pensacola and Georgia Railroad built the line between Quincy and Lake City which was completed by 1863. The line would then be extended east to Chattahoochee to connect with the Pensacola and Atlantic Railroad.

In 1882, the lines were acquired by Sir Edward Reed, and were renamed together as the Florida Central and Western Railroad. Two years later, Reed brought the Florida Central and Western and several other Florida railroads he had purchased under the umbrella of what was named the Florida Railway and Navigation Company, which, in 1888, was renamed the Florida Central and Peninsular Railroad (FC&P). In 1900, a year after purchasing the majority of FC&P stock, the newly organized Seaboard Air Line Railway (a predecessor of CSX Transportation) leased the FC&P and, in 1903, acquired it outright. CSX previously operated this segment as their Tallahassee Subdivision. The line has a centralized traffic control signal system between Tallahassee and Baldwin.

P&A Subdivision

The P&A Subdivision of the main line runs west from Chattahoochee to Pensacola, Florida. This segment of the main line was originally built in 1881-1883 by the Louisville and Nashville Railroad, operating it as a subsidiary, the Pensacola and Atlantic Railroad. William D. Chipley and Frederick R. De Funiak (General Manager of the L&N), both of whom are commemorated in the names of towns later built along the P&A line (Chipley and DeFuniak Springs), were among the founding officers of the P&A. The line was merged into the L&N in 1891. In 1982, the L&N was merged into the Seaboard Coast Line Railroad, which in 1986 became part of CSX Transportation, operating this segment as its P&A Subdivision (a reference to the Pensacola and Atlantic Railroad).

Bainbridge Subdivision

The Bainbridge Subdivision runs from the FGAR main line in Tallahassee north to Attapulgus, Georgia, where it connects to CSX's Bainbridge Subdivision, which continues north to Bainbridge, Georgia. The Bainbridge Subdivision was first built in 1901 by the Georgia Pine Railway. The line was only intended to be a shortline for logging, but since it provided an additional rail route from Georgia into Florida, traffic increased. As a result, the line was renamed the Georgia, Florida and Alabama Railway by the end of 1901. The GF&A Railway bought the Carrabelle, Tallahassee and Georgia Railroad in 1906, which ran from Tallahassee south to Carrabelle.

The Georgia, Florida and Alabama Railway, which extended from Richland, Georgia, to Carrabelle, Florida, at its greatest extent, became part of the Seaboard Air Line Railroad in 1927. The Seaboard lines, after various other mergers, became part of CSX Transportation in 1986.

The line's milepost numbers begin in Tallahassee at 52 and increase from there. This is due to the fact that the numbering still reflects the line's full length to Carrabelle, which was mile 0 before the track between there and Tallahassee was abandoned.

References

External links

In chronological order:
 "Notice of Intent to Acquire Lines" - filed with the Surface Transportation Board by FG&A, November 6, 2018
 "Local Officials Have Questions about FGAR Purchase" - WEARTV.com (Pensacola), November 13, 2018
 "Railroad Giant CSX Announces Deal to Sell Rail Line Between Pensacola and Jacksonville" - Pensacola News Journal, November 15, 2018
 "CSX Selling Florida Panhandle Lines" - Railway Age, November 16, 2018
 "Florida Gulf & Atlantic Railroad, LLC - Acquisition and Operation Exemption With Interchange Commitment - CSX Transportation, Inc." - Notice published in the Federal Register by the Surface Transportation Board, December 21, 2018
 "RailUSA Acquires CSX's 430-mile Florida Panhandle Rail Line" - press release from RailUSA, June 3, 2019
 "Florida Gulf and Atlantic Assumes Ownership of North Florida Rail Line" - WFSU.org (Tallahassee), July 29, 2019

Florida railroads
Spin-offs of CSX Transportation
Rail infrastructure in Florida